The Hellenic Space Agency, abbreviated as the HSA (ELDO), was the national space agency of Greece. It was founded at 19 March 2018 as a public limited company by the Ministry of Digital Policy, Telecommunications and Media.

Purpose
Its purpose was to shape the country's space strategy, to promote the participation of Greece in space programs, and to participate in space events.

Weblinks 
 HSC

References

Space agencies
Space program of Greece
Independent government agencies of Greece
Research institutes in Greece
2018 establishments in Greece
2019 disestablishments in Greece